Polacanthoderes is a genus of kinorhynchs in the family Echinoderidae. It consists of one species, Polacanthoderes martinezi Sørensen, 2008.

References 

Kinorhyncha
Ecdysozoa genera
Monotypic protostome genera